The diplomatic post of United States Ambassador to Slovenia was created after the disbanding of Yugoslavia and the United States recognizing the new nation of Slovenia on April 7, 1992. In August of that year, the American Embassy in Ljubljana opened with E. Allan Wendt as chargé d'affaires ad interim. He officially took over as ambassador in 1993.

Ambassadors

E. Allan Wendt
Appointed: May 26, 1993
Terminated mission: September 12, 1995
Victor Jackovich
Appointed: September 14, 1995
Terminated mission: February 13, 1998
Nancy Halliday Ely-Raphel
Appointed: September 2, 1998
Terminated mission: September 27, 2001
Johnny Young
Appointed: October 24, 2001
Terminated mission: September 17, 2004
Thomas Bolling Robertson
Appointed: September 29, 2004
Terminated mission: August 20, 2007
Yousif Ghafari
Appointed: May 29, 2008
Terminated mission: January 20, 2009
Joseph A. Mussomeli
Appointed: October 29, 2010
Terminated mission: January 31, 2015
Brent R. Hartley
Appointed: December 5, 2014
Terminated mission: July 16, 2018
Lynda C. Blanchard
Appointed: July 24, 2019
Terminated mission: January 20, 2021
Susan K. Falatko (Chargé d'Affaires)
Appointed: January 20, 2021
Terminated mission: February 17, 2022
Jamie Harpootlian
Appointed: February 17, 2022

See also
Slovenia – United States relations
Foreign relations of Slovenia
Ambassadors of the United States

References

United States Department of State: Background notes on Slovenia

External links

 United States Department of State: Chiefs of Mission for Slovenia
 United States Department of State: Slovenia
 United States Embassy in Ljubljana

Slovenia

United States